Cosmorrhyncha microcosma is a species of moth of the  family Tortricidae. It is found in the Democratic Republic of Congo, Ethiopia, Ghana, Kenya, South Africa, São Tomé & Principe and Uganda.

References

Moths described in 2004
Olethreutini